The San Antonio Gunslingers are a professional indoor football team for the National Arena League (NAL). The team is based in San Antonio, Texas, where they are currently playing their home games at the Freeman Coliseum.

History

Beginning with the American Arena League (2021) 
The Gunslingers joined the American Arena League for the 2021 season as an expansion team playing in the Texas-based West Division. They led the West Division going into the division championship, but lost to the North Texas Bulls 46–28 on June 6, 2021.

National Arena League (2022–present) 
On November 11, 2021, the Gunslingers joined the National Arena League. The league announced the sale of the team to Don and Brandon Rackler on June 7, 2022. The team went 4-8 and did not make the playoffs.

Schedule (2022) 

Reference:

Current roster

References

External Links
 Official Website

National Arena League teams
American Arena League
2020 establishments in Texas
American football teams established in 2020
American football teams in San Antonio